Jeanne Córdova (July 18, 1948 – January 10, 2016) was an American trailblazer of the lesbian and gay rights movement, founder of The Lesbian Tide, and a founder of the West Coast LGBT movement.  Córdova was a second-wave feminist lesbian activist and proud butch.

She was a prolific writer, journalist, and businesswoman, and a Lambda Literary, Publishing Triangle and Goldie Award winning author for her 2011 memoir When We Were Outlaws: a Memoir of Love and Revolution. In honor of her memory, Lambda Literary Foundation created the "Jeanne Córdova Words Scholarship" in 2016, and the Jeanne Córdova Prize for Lesbian/Queer Nonfiction in 2017.

Early years
Córdova was born in Bremerhaven, Germany in 1948, the second oldest of twelve children born to a Mexican father and Irish-American mother. She attended high school at Bishop Amat High School in La Puente, California, east of Los Angeles and went on to California State University, Los Angeles and the University of California, Los Angeles (UCLA), where she graduated cum laude with a bachelor's degree in Social Welfare.  She interned in the African-American and Latino communities of Watts & East Los Angeles and earned a master's degree in Social Work at UCLA in 1972.

Life and career
Córdova entered the Immaculate Heart of Mary convent after high school in 1966, but left in 1968 and completed her social work degree while becoming a community organizer/activist and later a journalist. She began her lesbian and gay rights career as Los Angeles chapter President of the Daughters of Bilitis (DOB). During her DOB presidency she opened the first lesbian center in Los Angeles, in 1971. Under Córdova the DOB chapter newsletter evolved into The Lesbian Tide (1970–1980),  with Córdova serving as editor and publisher of what became "the newspaper of record for the lesbian feminist decade". The publication ranked "highest in the criteria of journalistic excellence".

In the 1970s Córdova was a key organizer of four lesbian conferences, among them the first West Coast Lesbian Conference at Metropolitan Community Church (1971) and the first National Lesbian Conference at the University of California, Los Angeles (1973).  She also sat on the Board of the Los Angeles Gay Community Services Center and became the Human Rights Editor of the progressive weekly, the Los Angeles Free Press (1973–1976).

Córdova was elected as a delegate to the first National Women's Conference for International Women's Year in Houston (1977), where she was a moving force behind the passage of the lesbian affirmative action resolution.  She was Southern California media director of the campaign to defeat the anti-gay ballot Proposition 6 Briggs Initiative (1978), which sought to purge lesbian and gay teachers from California's public schools.  She went on to be the founder of the National Lesbian Feminist Organization's first convention (1978), and president of the Stonewall Democratic Club (1979–1981).

In the 1980s, Córdova helped found the Gay and Lesbian Caucus of the Democratic Party and served as one of thirty openly lesbian delegates to the 1980 Democratic National Convention in New York City. She was a founder of the Los Angeles Gay and Lesbian Press Association (1983) and a founding board member of Los Angeles lesbian community center Connexxus Women's Center/Centro de Mujeres (1984–1988). She also worked as media director for STOP 64, the campaign to defeat the 1986 California Proposition 64 AIDS quarantine measure by Lyndon LaRouche.

During the 1980s and 1990s, Córdova founded and published the Community Yellow Pages (1981–1999), the first, and later the nation's largest, LGBT business directory; the New Age Telephone Book (1987–1992); and Square Peg Magazine (1992–94), covering queer culture and literature. In 1995, she was elected Board President of ONE National Gay & Lesbian Archives, and co-founded the Lesbian Legacy Collection at the ONE Archives with Yolanda Retter.

In 1999, Córdova sold the Community Yellow Pages and went to live for eight years in Todos Santos, BCS Mexico. She and her spouse, Lynn Harris Ballen, co-founded a non-profit organization for economic justice, The Palapa Society of Todos Santos, AC, and Córdova served as its first president until 2007.

Returning to Los Angeles, Córdova and Ballen co-founded LEX – The Lesbian Exploratorium, which sponsored the art and history exhibit  Genderplay in Lesbian Culture (2009) and created the Lesbian Legacy Wall at ONE Archives (2009). Córdova then organized and chaired the 2010 Butch Voices Los Angeles Conference.

Her memoir When We Were Outlaws; A Memoir of Love & Revolution received the 2012 Lambda Literary Award ("Lammy")  for best "Lesbian Memoir/Biography",  Golden Crown Literary Society Award ("Goldie") for best "Short Story/Essay/Collections (Non-Erotica)"., American Library Association Stonewall Book Awards, 2013 - Honor, and Judy Grahn Award for Lesbian Non-fiction, 2012 Publishing Triangle.

Writing and journalism

Books
When We Were Outlaws; A Memoir of Love & Revolution (2011) Spinsters Ink Books.  
Kicking the Habit: A Lesbian Nun Story (1990) Multiple Dimensions. 
Sexism: It's A Nasty Affair (1974) New Way Books.

Anthologies
 "Anita Bryant's Anti-Gay Crusade" in  The Right Side of History: 100 Years of LGBTQ Activism, ed. Adrian Brooks, Cleis Press (2015) 
"Marriage Throws A Monkey Wrench" in Untangling the Knot: Queer Voices on Marriage, Relationships & Identity , ed. Carter Sickels, Ooligan Press (2015) 
"The New Politics of Butch" in Persistence: All Ways Butch and Femme, ed. Ivan Coyote & Zena Sharman, Arsenal Pulp Press (2011)- Lammy finalist. 
"A Tale of Two Hangouts: Gay & Lesbian Civil Wars in the '70s" in Love, West Hollywood, ed. Chris Freeman & James J. Berg, Alyson Books (2008) – Lammy finalist. 
"Cheap Gold: a seduction" in Hot & Bothered 2, ed. Karen Tulchinsky.  Arsenal Pulp Press (1999)  
"Camp Fires" in On My Honor, Lesbian Girl Scouts, ed. Nancy Manahan. Madwoman Press (San Francisco) (1997) 
"A Tale of Two Brothers" in Tomboys!:Tales of Dyke Derring-Do, ed. Lynne Yamaguchi Fletcher. Alyson Publications (1995) 
"The Mantra of Orgasm" in Sexy & Spiritual/Viva Arts Quarterly- A journal of Latino(a) gay and lesbian writers. (1994)
"Conversation With A Gentleman Butch" in Dagger: On Butch Women, ed. Lily Burana & Roxxie.  Cleis Press (1994)  
"Butches, Lies & Feminism." In Persistent Desire: A Femme Butch Reader, ed. Joan Nestle. Alyson Publications. (1992) – Lammy Award winner.  
"The Intimate is Transformational" in Common Lives/Lesbian Lives, a lesbian quarterly. (1990)
"My Immaculate Heart" in Lesbian Nuns: Breaking the Silence, ed. Nancy Manahan & Rosemary Curb. Naiad Press, reprinted by Warner Books. (1985) – Lammy Award winner. 
"Trauma in the Heterosexual Zone" in The Lesbian Path. Edited by Peg Cruikshank. Naiad Press. (1980) 
"How To Come Out Without Being Thrown Out" and "What's A Dyke To Do?" in After You're Out, ed. Karla Jay & Allen Young. Pyramid Books. (1975)

Columnist
American Herald newspaper, Cabo San Lucas, Mexico, (2000–2002)
ICON newspaper, San Francisco. (1995–1998)
Los Angeles Village View, 1995
The Advocate (1974–1976)
Los Angeles Free Press, Columnist and Human Rights Editor (1973–1976).
Lesbian Tide, News Editor, Editor in Chief, 1971–1980

News and feature stories
News and feature stories by Córdova been published in: The Guardian, The Nation, The Edge, Frontiers in LA, OUT! (New York City), the Washington Blade (D.C.), Orange County Blade, Philadelphia Gay News, The Bay Area Reporter (San Francisco), Seattle Gay News, The Body Politic (Boston), The Lesbian News (L.A.), Ten Percent Magazine (San Francisco), The Los Angeles Free Press, The Advocate, The Los Angeles Village View, ICON, and The Lesbian Tide.

Personal life
Córdova's life partner was Lynn Harris Ballen, a feminist radio journalist  and the daughter of South African freedom fighter Frederick John Harris. They lived in the Hollywood Hills, California and Todos Santos, BCS Mexico, and created various media projects together - including Square Peg Magazine and history-themed lesbian feminist cultural events, exhibits, and literature.

Death
Jeanne Córdova, aged 67, died on January 10, 2016, from metastatic brain cancer at her home in Los Angeles, California. Prior to death, Córdova wrote A Letter About Dying, to My Lesbian Communities, a farewell missive published in several lesbian-related publications in September 2015, in which she informed the community of her terminal illness; and donated a $2 million legacy gift to Astraea Lesbian Foundation for Justice, creating the Jeanne R. Cordova Fund.  Her obituary appeared in the Los Angeles Times  and she was remembered on Last Word, BBC Radio 4's weekly obituary programme in January 2016.

Awards and keynotes
 Selected as one of 200 women inscribed in the Place du Panthéon, Paris, 2019. Monumental Feminist Memorial, Les MonumentalEs collective.
 Honoree, Fueling the Frontlines Awards 2018.  Astraea Lesbian Foundation for Justice
 Etheridge award – WeHo Dyke March, June 2015
 Honored in Wells Fargo LGBT history mural, West Hollywood (unveiled June 5, 2014)
 Morris Kight Lifetime Achievement Award, Christopher Street West (2009)
 Velvetpark's Official Top 25 Significant Queer Women of 2010 
 Speaker, Mexico City Book Fair/Feria del Libro del Zocalo de la Ciudad de Mexico (2006)
 Cultural Hero Visibility Award, ONE National Gay & Lesbian Archives (2003)
 Rainbow Key Award for lifetime community service, City of West Hollywood (2002)
 Recognition Award "for pioneering work on behalf of gay and lesbian rights". Society for the Scientific Study of Sexuality (1998)
 Pioneer of the Movement award (for role in co-founding the gay civil rights movement on the West Coast in the 1970s.) Lesbian Gay and Bisexual Graduate Student Conference, University of Southern California (1995)
 Uncommon Women:  selected as a notable woman, compiled by the Legacy Foundation NY. (1994)
 Community Recognition Award, Southern California Women for Understanding for founding and publishing Community Yellow Pages, an LA community institution (1983)
 Community Service Award, Gay Academic Union (1981)
 First open lesbian to appear in Who's Who in America (1978–79)
 Keynote address Butch Voices conference 2009
 Keynote address Stonewall Book Awards 2012

Archival sources
Detailed records of Córdova's activist accomplishments – including records of The Lesbian Tide – are preserved in the ONE National Gay & Lesbian Archives at the University of Southern California. The collection, including an extensive photo collection, is fully processed and available for use by researchers. The Online Archive of California (a project of the California Digital Library) offers the complete finding aid.

Works about Jeanne Córdova
 Jeanne Cordova: Butches, Lies & Feminism (2017, USA). Documentary by Gregorio Davila.

See also
 List of feminists

References

External links
 
  This Lesbian World, official blog of Jeanne Córdova
 
  The Lesbian Tide (July/August 1979), vol. 9 (1). (via Houston LGBT History.org)

1948 births
2016 deaths
20th-century American non-fiction writers
20th-century American women writers
20th-century American Roman Catholic nuns
21st-century American non-fiction writers
21st-century American women writers
American lesbian writers
American memoirists
American women journalists
American women memoirists
Former Roman Catholic religious sisters and nuns
Lesbian feminists
Lesbian memoirists
Women civil rights activists
Activists from California
Journalists from California
LGBT people from California
American LGBT rights activists
American people of Irish descent
American writers of Mexican descent
People from Bremerhaven
People from La Puente, California
Deaths from brain cancer in the United States
Lambda Literary Award winners
UCLA Luskin School of Public Affairs alumni